Baba Baj Singh (died 1716; his first name is alternatively spelt as Baaj), also known as Baj Bahadur, was a Sikh general, governor, scholar and martyr from present-day India.

Family
Baj Singh's family was native to Mirpur Patti, a village in Amritsar district of the Punjab. He was born into a Jat Sikh family of the Bal clan.

Execution
He was executed on 9 June 1716 on the outskirts of Delhi, on the bank of the Yamuna river along with his seven brothers and Banda Singh Bahadur.

Battles fought by Baj Singh
 Battle of Sonipat
 Battle of Samana
 Battle of Sadhaura
 Battle of Chappar Chiri
 Battle of Jammu
 Battle of Jalalabad (1710)
 Battle of Lohgarh
 Battle of Gurdas Nangal or Siege of Gurdaspur

References

Indian generals
Executed Indian people
People executed by the Mughal Empire
Executed military personnel